Choreya is a small village in Ranchi (capital of the Indian state Jharkhand). It is situated in Chanho block. It is one of the 67 villages of Chanho.

Demographics
 India census, it has a population of 4,994. Males constitute 51.2% of the population and females 48.8%. Choreya has an average literacy rate of 76.58% (census 2011) where the male literacy rate 85.69% is and female literacy rate is 67.08%.

Education 
The following schools are based in Choreya:
 Devendra Nath Singh High School, Choreya
 Government Middle School, Choreya
 Government Girls Middle School, Choreya
 Harizan School, Choreya

References 

Villages in Ranchi district